Jay Clarke was the defending champion but chose not to defend his title.

Yūichi Sugita won the title after defeating João Menezes 7–6(7–2), 1–6, 6–2 in the final.

Seeds
All seeds receive a bye into the second round.

Draw

Finals

Top half

Section 1

Section 2

Bottom half

Section 3

Section 4

References

External links
Main draw

2019 ATP Challenger Tour
2019 Singles